Rainie may refer to:

 Rainie Yang (Chinese: 楊丞琳; born 1984), a Taiwanese singer, actress and television host
 Robert Rainie (1860–1945), a Scottish rugby union player
 Lorraine "Rainie" Highway, a fictional character from the BBC One soap opera EastEnders
 Lorraine (given name)
 Loraine (name)

See also 
 Raini (disambiguation)